Iqbal Ahmad Akhund (born 21 August 1924) is a Pakistani former diplomat and writer who served as the 7th permanent representative of Pakistan to the United Nations and the 5th national security advisor to the 11th prime minister of Pakistan, Benazir Bhutto for foreign affairs and national security. He also served as chairperson of the Group of 77 (G77) from 1976 to 1977.

A former head of the United Nations Centre Against Apartheid, Akhund also served as a Special Representative of the Secretary-General and  United Nations Assistant Secretary-General from 1979 to 1987.

Early life 
Akhund was born in Hyderabad State, Sindh Province. His father was a session judge in British Indian government and retired in the mid-1950s as a chief justice of Khairpur. In 1945, Akhund obtained his master's degree with economic and political science in Karachi. Following the partition of India, his family emigrated from India to Pakistan and they settled in Karachi.

Career 
Akhund joined the foreign services after completing his civil services in 1948. He was appointed at various posts during his career such as permanent representative to the United Nations, assistant secretary-general at the United Nations, the president of the Security Council, and president of the United Nations Economic and Social Council. After retiring from foreign services, he was appointed as the national security advisor in the government of Benazir Bhutto from 1988 to 1990.

Before serving at the UN, he served as ambassador of Pakistan to Egypt, Yugoslavia and France. Prior to his retirement from foreign services on security, he was appointed as United Nations Resident Coordinator in Lebanon, and chairperson of the Security Council Committee on Sanctions against Rhodesia, a part of the United Nations Security Council.

Publications

References 

1924 births
Living people
Ambassadors of Pakistan to Egypt
Ambassadors of Pakistan to France
Ambassadors of Pakistan to Yugoslavia
Indian emigrants to Pakistan
Pakistani writers
People from Hyderabad State
Permanent Representatives of Pakistan to the United Nations
Special Representatives of the Secretary-General of the United Nations
United Nations Security Council officials